The name Winnie has been used for one tropical cyclone in the Northeastern Pacific, eleven tropical cyclones in the Northwestern Pacific Ocean and one in the Southwest Pacific Ocean.

Winnie has been used on the modern six-year lists in the East Pacific:
 Hurricane Winnie (1983) – an out of season December storm that dissipated before making landfall.

Winnie has also been used for ten tropical cyclones in the Western Pacific:
 Typhoon Winnie (1953) (T5317)
 Typhoon Winnie (1958) (T5810)
 Tropical Storm Winnie (1961)
 Typhoon Winnie (1964) (T6403, 04W, Dading)
 Tropical Storm Winnie (1966) (T6615, 15W) – hit Japan.
 Tropical Storm Winnie (1969) (T6906, 06W, Goring)
 Tropical Storm Winnie (1972) (T7212, 12W)
 Typhoon Winnie (1975) (T7510, 12W) – minimal typhoon that stayed at sea.
 Tropical Storm Winnie (1978) (T7830, 34W) – moderately strong tropical storm that ended the season.
 Typhoon Winnie (1997) (T9713, 14W, Ibiang) – One of the largest tropical cyclones on record; impacted areas of northern China as a powerful typhoon.

Winnie has also been used for one tropical cyclone in the Philippines by PAGASA in the Western Pacific.
 Tropical Depression Winnie (2004) – a tropical depression only recognized by PAGASA.

Winnie has also been used for one tropical cyclone in the Southwest Pacific:
 Cyclone Winnie (1978)

Pacific hurricane set index articles
Pacific typhoon set index articles
Australian region cyclone set index articles